Arlington Heights is a neighborhood in Fort Worth, Texas.

A Denver, Colorado-originating promoter named H. B. Chamberlain bought  of land from a Chicago financier named Tom Hurley and Robert McCart. He attempted to develop Arlington Heights, but a hotel he built, Ye Arlington Inn, burned in 1894 and he died in a bicycle accident in London. Arlington Heights was developed after the United States moved military personnel in the surrounding area in World War I.

Joyce E. Williams, a sociologist who wrote Black Community Control: A Study of Transition in a Texas Ghetto, wrote that almost all of the Lake Como women worked in Arlington Heights. Those women referred to it as "Little California", a reference to a fantasy idea of the state of California.

Education

The Fort Worth Independent School District serves Arlington Heights. North Hi-Mount Elementary School serves Arlington Heights. Arlington Heights High School is in the community.

References
 George, Juliet. Fort Worth's Arlington Heights (Images of America). Arcadia Publishing, 2010. , 9780738578934.

Notes

External links  
 Arlington Heights Neighborhood Association website

Neighborhoods in Fort Worth, Texas